Aspidistra recondita is a species of flowering plant. A. recondita takes its name from the Latin reconditus, meaning "hidden", referring to its sexual organs being completely hidden inside its ovoid perigone, with a small opening. Given it was described from an A. lurida specimen, neither its distribution nor habitat are known.

Description
This species is a perennial herb. Its rhizome is creeping, and measures  in diameter.

References

Further reading
Tillich, H‐J. "An updated and improved determination key for Aspidistra Ker‐Gawl.(Ruscaceae, Monocotyledons)." Feddes Repertorium 119.5‐6 (2008): 449–462.
Tillich, Hans-Juergen. "The genus Aspidistra Ker-Gawl.(Asparagaceae) in Vietnam." Taiwania 59.1 (2014): 1–8.
Averyanov, Leonid V., and H‐J. Tillich. "Aspidistra laotica, A. multiflora, A. oviflora and A. semiaperta spp. nov.(Asparagaceae, Convallariaceae ss) from eastern Indochina." Nordic Journal of Botany (2014).

External links

recondita
Flora of Vietnam
Plants described in 2007